Dock jumping also known as dock diving  is a dog sport in which dogs compete in jumping for distance or height from a dock into a body of water. 
 
There are dock jumping events in the United States and other countries such as United Kingdom,
Australia, Germany, and Austria.

History
Dock jumping first appeared in 1997 at the Incredible Dog Challenge, an event sponsored and produced by pet food manufacturer Purina. 
There are now a number of organizations that run dock jumping competitions in different countries.

In the United States, DockDogs was established in 2000; its first event was at the ESPN 2000 Great Outdoor Games competition.

The Super Retriever Series Super Dock was established in 2002 and created as a qualifier for ESPN Great Outdoor Games along with the Super Retriever Series Retriever Trials. The Super Retriever Series Dock is a competition but also allows for titles through the United Kennel Club which started in 2014.  The SRS Dock events held are Super Fly, Super Verticle (V) and Raider Run which is a Speed Retrieve.  www.superretrieverseries.com 
 
Splash Dogs was started in 2003. 
Ultimate Air Dogs was founded in 2005, by former Major League Baseball player Milt Wilcox.
In 2008, UAD partnered with the United Kennel Club (UKC) which added dock jumping as a recognized UKC sport. 
In 2009, UKC also recognized competitions run by Splash Dogs.
Dogs can get UKC titles by competing in dock distance or height jumping like they can in agility, obedience, weight pulling, and others.

North American Diving Dogs was formed in 2014 and offers diving dog titles recognized by the American Kennel Club (AKC) and Canadian Kennel Club (CKC).

In the United Kingdom, Dash 'n' Splash, which runs  competitions across southern England, was established in 2005, followed by JettyDogs in 2007.

K9 Aqua Sports was started in 2014, and runs competitions across all of England and Scotland

Dock
but may differ depending on the sanctioning organization. The dock is covered in artificial turf, carpet, or a rubber mat for better traction and safety for the competitors. The handler may use any amount of the dock and they may start their dog from any point on the dock when competing.

Official jump distance

The jump distance is measured, by most organizations, from the lateral midpoint of the end of the dock to the point at which the base of the dog's tail (where the tail meets the body) breaks the water's surface. DockDogs Big Air Discipline measures the distance to the point that the base of the dog's tail breaks the surface of the water. Purina's Incredible Diving Dog event measures the distance to the point that the dog's nose is at when its body enters the water.
The jump distance is measured electronically using digital video freeze frame technology or, in some cases, is measured manually by judges.

Each team takes two jumps in round-robin format. The longer of the two jumps is that team's score for that competition. 
A jump in which the dog's tail enters the water at a point further from the dock than another part of the dog's body is scored using the point of the dog (for example, the head/nose) that breaks the surface of the water closest to the dock.
If the dog's strides are off so that the dog starts its jump before the end of the dock, that is a disadvantage, because the jump is always judged from the edge of the dock, not from where the dog leaves the dock.
A jump is only official if or when the toy leaves the handler's hand. The dog is not required to retrieve the toy for the jump to count.

Techniques

		                          
Two different techniques can be used to encourage the dog to jump into the water.

Place and send
Walk the dog to the end of the dock and or, hold the dog back while throwing the toy into the water. Walk the dog back to the starting point, place the dog, then release or send the dog to go get the toy. This is effective for dogs that are not trained to wait or stay on the dock, especially if they have a lot of speed and can compensate for the lack of lift at the end of the dock.

Chase
The dog is placed in a stay or wait at its starting position on the dock. The handler walks to the end of the dock holding the toy, then calls the dog and throws the toy, trying to keep the toy just in front of the dog's nose so they chase it into the water.
The goal is to use this method to get the dog at the optimum launch angle to increase distance by getting him to jump up, instead of just out or flat, as with place and send.
The chase method is difficult to master. However, if the dog is toy-driven, he can be trained to follow the toy.

Divisions
There are many divisions depending on the sanctioning organization. All teams are ranked according to how far they jump and are rated against teams within their own divisions for placements. Even small dogs have their own division, "lap dogs", along with older dogs (8 years and older), the "veteran" division. DockDogs also recognizes dogs over the age of 10 with their "Legend Dog" division.

Notable competitions
ESPN's Great Outdoor Games
Super Retriever Series
DockDogs World Championships
Dueling Dogs World Championships

Records

References

External links

Dog sports